Christela Jacques is a Haitian beauty pageant titleholder was appointed by the organization of Miss Universe Haiti as the Miss Universe Haiti 2012.  She was chosen from among other 20 women to take the title.  Miss Haiti 2012 and represented her country at the Miss Universe 2012 pageant.

References

External links
 http://plongaye.com/2012/11/21/christela-jacques-miss-haiti-universe-2012/ 

Haitian beauty pageant winners
Miss Universe 2012 contestants
Haitian female models
Living people
Year of birth missing (living people)